A T20I is an international cricket match between two teams that have official Twenty20 International status, as determined by the International Cricket Council. It is played under the rules of Twenty20 cricket and is the shortest form of the game. Afghanistan played its first T20I match on 1 February 2010, against Ireland, losing the match by 5 wickets. Their first win came three days later in their second T20I match, which was against Canada, with Afghanistan winning by 5 wickets with one ball remaining.

This list comprises all members of the Afghanistan cricket team who have played at least one T20I match. It is initially arranged in the order in which each player won his first Twenty20 cap. Where more than one player won his first Twenty20 cap in the same match, those players are listed alphabetically by surname.

Key

Players
Statistics are correct as of 19 February 2023.

Notes

See also
 List of Afghanistan Test cricketers
 List of Afghanistan ODI cricketers
 List of Afghanistan first-class cricketers
 List of Afghanistan Twenty20 International cricket records

References

Afghanistan Twenty20
Cricket